Agglomerins are bacterial natural products, identified as metabolites of Pantoea agglomerans which was isolated in 1989 from river water in Kobe, Japan. They belong to the class of tetronate antibiotics, which include tetronomycin, tetronasin, and abyssomicin C. The members of the agglomerins differ only in the composition of the acyl chain attached to the tetronate ring. They possess antibiotic activity against anaerobic bacteria and weak activity against aerobic bacteria in vitro. The structures were solved in 1990. Agglomerin A is the major component (38%), followed by agglomerin B (30%), agglomerin C (24%), and agglomerin D (8%).

Biosynthesis 

The biosynthetic gene cluster for agglomerins is 12 kb, and codes for 7 open reading frames. The glyceryl-S-ACP is derived from D-1,3-bisphosphoglycerate by Agg2 (glyceryl-S-ACP synthase) and Agg3 (acyl carrier protein). The acyl chain is taken from primary metabolism as a 3-oxoacyl-CoA thioester. The glyceryl-S-ACP and 3-oxoacyl-CoA thioester are joined by Agg1, a FabH-like ketosynthase, forming new C-C and C-O bonds.  The primary alcohol of the intermediate 4 is then acylated by Agg4, using acetyl-CoA, before the abstraction of a proton and concomitant loss of acetate catalyzed by Agg5 to generate the exocyclic double bond.

References 

Antibiotics
Lactones
Natural products